Obock Airport  is an airport serving Obock, a city in the Obock Region of Djibouti.

Facilities

References

External links
 

Airports in Djibouti
Obock Region